Coleman is a census-designated place and former incorporated city in Randolph County, Georgia, United States.  The population was 149 at the 2000 census. The city was abolished by House Bill 1102 effective January 1, 2007, and no longer exists as a municipality.

History
The community was named after Andy Coleman, the original owner of the town site. The Georgia General Assembly incorporated the place in 1889 as the "Town of Coleman" with municipal corporate limits extending in a one-half mile radius from the South Western Railroad depot.

Geography

Coleman is located at  (31.672794, -84.890269).

Demographics

As of the census of 2000, there were 149 people, 66 households, and 34 families residing in the city. The racial makeup of the city was 38.26% White and 61.74% African American.

There were 66 households, out of which 19.7% had children under the age of 18 living with them, 36.4% were married couples living together, 13.6% had a female householder with no husband present, and 47.0% were non-families. 43.9% of all households were made up of individuals, and 15.2% had someone living alone who was 65 years of age or older. The average household size was 2.26 and the average family size was 3.26.

In the city, the population was spread out, with 25.5% under the age of 18, 4.0% from 18 to 24, 31.5% from 25 to 44, 24.8% from 45 to 64, and 14.1% who were 65 years of age or older. The median age was 37 years. For every 100 females, there were 93.5 males. For every 100 females age 18 and over, there were 91.4 males.

The median income for a household in the city was $24,583, and the median income for a family was $30,938. Males had a median income of $22,750 versus $18,958 for females. The per capita income for the city was $13,279. There were 24.3% of families and 32.0% of the population living below the poverty line, including 41.2% of under eighteens and 53.3% of those over 64.

Gallery

References

Census-designated places in Georgia (U.S. state)
Populated places in Randolph County, Georgia
Populated places disestablished in 2007
Former municipalities in Georgia (U.S. state)